The Metropolitan–London League was a short-lived football league for clubs in and around London. It was formed in 1971 by a merger of the Greater London League and the Metropolitan League (which had lost several clubs to the Southern League). It ran with two divisions until 1974, reduced to one in 1974–75 season, after which it merged with the Spartan League to form the London Spartan League, which was later renamed the Spartan League. It merged with the South Midlands League in 1997 to form the modern Spartan South Midlands League

List of champions

Seasons

1971–72

Division One
The new Division One was composed of:
Eight clubs from the Greater London League (BROB Barnet, Canvey Island, Chingford, Eton Manor, Ford United, Swanley, Ulysses and Willesden)
Four clubs from the Metropolitan League (Cray Wanderers, Epping Town, Hatfield Town and Sheppey United)
One club from the Kent League (Faversham Town)
East Ham United

Division Two
All clubs in Division Two except Muirhead Sports had come from the Greater London League

Also Woolwich Polytechnic became Thames Polytechnic, 
Northern Polytechnic became Polytechnic and Vokins became 279 Chislehurst.

1972–73

Division One
Division One featured one new club, Penhill Standard, who had been promoted from Division Two the previous season.

Division Two
Division Two featured one new club, East Thurrock United.

1973–74

Division One
Division One featured two new clubs, East Thurrock United and Highfield, both promoted from Division Two the previous season.

Division Two
Division Two featured two new clubs:
Alma Swanley
Penhill Standard (relegated from Division One)

1974–75

Member clubs
Member clubs during the league's existence included:

279 Chislehurst
Alma Swanley
Barkingside
Bexley
Brentstonians
BROB Barnet
Canvey Island
Chingford
Cray Wanderers
East Ham United
East Thurrock United
Epping Town
Eton Manor
Faversham Town
Ford United
Hatfield Town
Heathside Sports
Highfield
India & M Docks
Muirhead Sports
Penhill Standard
Polytechnic
Rolenmill
RAS & RA
Sheppey United
Swanley Town
Thames Polytechnic
Ulysses
Welwyn Garden City
Willesden

References

 
Defunct football leagues in England
 Metropolitan